Freedom Hall Civic Center is a multi-purpose arena in Johnson City, Tennessee.

Starting in 2014, it became the basketball venue for East Tennessee State University.

History
Freedom Hall Civic Center opened in 1974 on the Liberty Bell Complex next to Science Hill High School. The arena was built by the city of Johnson City to be used as an entertainment venue and additional space for the middle and high schools located on the property. Over the years the venue has been used for sporting events, theatrical productions, concerts, ice shows, and a rodeo venue.

Former and current entertainment include concerts from Van Halen, Bon Jovi, Eric Clapton, Def Leppard, Poison (band), Ozzy Osbourne, Motley Crue,  KISS, Bruce Springsteen, Third Day, For King & Country, Chicago, AC/DC, Metallica, Elvis Presley, Elton John, and Aerosmith. Entertainment from professional wrestling organizations Jim Crockett Promotions, WWE, Smoky Mountain Wrestling, and from the Ringling Bros. and Barnum & Bailey Circus.

See also
 List of NCAA Division I basketball arenas

References

External links
Official Website

Basketball venues in Tennessee
College basketball venues in the United States
East Tennessee State Buccaneers basketball
Music venues in East Tennessee
Indoor arenas in Tennessee
Johnson City, Tennessee
1974 establishments in Tennessee
Sports venues completed in 1974